Montalto di Castro is a comune (municipality) in the Province of Viterbo in the Italian region Lazio, located about  northwest of Rome and about  west of Viterbo.

It is home to a large fossil fuel powered power plant managed by ENEL and the largest solar PV power plant in Italy.

Transportation
Montalto di Castro is linked by road to the European route E80 motorway. The Italian state railway Ferrovie dello Stato Italiane provides a rail link that allows passengers to travel to Rome, Pisa, Orbetello, or Civitavecchia.

Notable people
Lea Padovani, actress.
Alice Sabatini, Miss Italia 2015

See also 
 Montalto di Castro Nuclear Power Station

References

External links
 www.comune.montaltodicastro.vt.it/
 Tuscia 360 about Montalto di Castro with VR panoramas
 http://www.e656.net/orario/stazione/montalto_di_castro.html

Cities and towns in Lazio